The 1984 Ole Miss Rebels football team represented the University of Mississippi in the sport of American football during the 1984 NCAA Division I-A football season. The season closed with a victory over rival Mississippi State.

Schedule

Personnel

References

Ole Miss
Ole Miss Rebels football seasons
Ole Miss Rebels football